Petrina is a village and a community in the municipal unit of Falaisia, Arcadia, Greece. It is situated in the northern foothills of the Taygetus mountains. It is 3 km east of Falaisia, 4 km west of Skortsinos, 4 km south of Voutsaras, 7 km southeast of Leontari and 14 km southeast of Megalopoli. In 2011 Petrina had a population of 44 for the village, and 69 for the community, which includes the village Spanaiika.

Population

In media 
In 2014 the US TV show Finding Your Roots found that Tina Fey have ancestors from this village.

See also
List of settlements in Arcadia

References

External links
History and information about Petrina
 Petrina GTP Travel Pages

Falaisia
Populated places in Arcadia, Peloponnese